De sjove år is a Danish 1959 comedy film directed by Palle Kjærulff-Schmidt and starring Frits Helmuth, Ghita Nørby, Ebbe Langberg, Malene Schwartz.

Cast
Frits Helmuth
Ghita Nørby
Ebbe Langberg
Malene Schwartz
Ellen Winther
Jens Østerholm
Preben Kaas
Gerda Madsen
Clara Pontoppidan
Helge Kjærulff-Schmidt
Kirsten Walther

References

External links
 
 

Danish comedy films
Films directed by Palle Kjærulff-Schmidt
Films scored by Sven Gyldmark